Albert Palle (14 September 1916 Le Havre (Seine-Maritime) - 8 March 2007 Paris) was a French writer, and winner of the 1959 Prix Renaudot.

Life
He was a friend of Raymond Aron, and student of Jean-Paul Sartre.
He fought in the resistance and was awarded the Croix de guerre.
He wrote for the paper Le Combat, France Dimanche, and Elle.

Works
L'expérience: roman, R. Julliard, 1959
Die Erfahrung: Roman, Rowohlt, 1961
Experience,  Doubleday, 1961
Les marches: roman,  Julliard, 1962
Les chaudières et la lune: roman, R. Julliard, 1965
Les mots perdus: nouvelles, Éd. du Cercle des amis des livres, 1994,

References

External links
"Albert Palle", French wikipedia

1916 births
2007 deaths
Writers from Le Havre
Prix Renaudot winners
Recipients of the Croix de Guerre 1939–1945 (France)